Luneau is a surname. Notable people with the surname include:
 Alexandre Luneau (born 1988), French poker player
 David Luneau (born 1965), American politician from New Hampshire
 Falco De Jong Luneau (born 1984), Austrian-Dutch singer-songwriter
 Jay Luneau (born 1962), American politician from Louisiana
 Michel Luneau (1934–2012), French writer

French-language surnames